Jack Peter Morley (born 25 June 2001) is an English cricketer. He made his first-class debut on 6 September 2020, for Lancashire in the 2020 Bob Willis Trophy. He made his List A debut on 23 July 2021, for Lancashire in the 2021 Royal London One-Day Cup.

References

External links
 

2001 births
Living people
English cricketers
Lancashire cricketers
Cricketers from Rochdale